Hazim Al-Sha'arawi is the deputy director of Al-Aqsa Television in the Palestinian National Authority.  He is the creator and moderator of the children's show Tomorrow's Pioneers, which is broadcast on Al-Aqsa Television. He also moderates the Al-Aqsa Voice children's radio program, Ovan and Branches

References

Living people
Year of birth missing (living people)